Mizan Alem (born 22 January 2002) is an Ethiopian long-distance runner who specializes in the 5000 metres. She was the gold medallist at the World Athletics U20 Championships in 2021.

References

External links 
 Mizan Alem at World Athletics

2002 births
Living people
Ethiopian female long-distance runners
World Athletics U20 Championships winners
21st-century Ethiopian women